This article lists the official squads for the 1987 Rugby World Cup that took place in New Zealand and Australia from 22 May until 20 June 1987. The 1987 Rugby World Cup was the inaugural Rugby World Cup; the world championship for rugby union. Sixteen nations were invited to partake in the tournament, with the notable exception of South Africa; who were excluded from the tournament due to issues surrounding Apartheid.

Players marked (c) were named as captain for their national squad. All details, such as number of international caps and player age, are current as of the opening day of the tournament on 22 May 1987.

Overview
Below is a table listing all the head coaches and captains for each nation.

Pool 1

Head coach:  Alan Jones

Head coach:  George Hook /  Ron Mayes

Head coach:  Martin Green

Head coach:  Katsumi Miyaji

Pool 2

Head coach:  Tony Gray

Head coach:  Gary Johnston

Prior to the tournament, Nigel Carr withdrew from the Irish squad due to injury.
Head coaches:  Mick Doyle (replaced by Syd Millar) /  Jim Davidson

Head coach:  Mailefihi Tuku'aho

Pool 3

Head coaches:  Brian Lochore
 Andy Dalton was ruled out of the tournament due to an injury in a practice session. As a result, David Kirk assumed the role of captain.

Head coaches:  Josateki Sovau and  George Simpkin

Head coach:  Marco Bollesan

Head coaches:  Héctor Silva /  Ángel Guastella

Before the match against New Zealand, Martín Yangüela withdrew due to an injury and was replaced by Marcelo Faggi.

Pool 4

Head coach:  Jacques Fouroux

Head Coach:  Derrick Grant

Head coach:  Mihai Naca

Head coach:  Brian Murphy

References

Rugby World Cup squads
Squads, 1987 Rugby World Cup